General Connor may refer to:

Patrick Edward Connor (1820–1891), Union Army brigadier general and brevet major general
Seldon Connor (1839–1917), Union Army brigadier general
William Durward Connor (1874–1960), U.S. Army major general

See also
Fox Conner (1874–1951), U.S. Army major general
James Conner (general) (1829–1883), Confederate States Army brigadier general